The 2007–08 Irish Cup was the 128th edition of Northern Ireland's premier football knock-out cup competition. The competition began with the preliminary round on 15 September 2007 and culminated with the final at Windsor Park, Belfast, on 3 May 2008.

Linfield were the defending champions, winning their 38th Irish Cup last season after a 3–2 penalty shootout win over Dungannon Swifts in the 2007 final after the game finished 2–2 after extra time. They successfully defended the cup to win it for the third successive season by defeating Coleraine 2–1 in the final.

Results

Preliminary round

|}

First round

|}

Second round

|}

Third round

|}

Fourth round

|}

Fifth round

|}

Replays

|}

Sixth round

|}

Replays

|}

Quarter-finals

|}

Replays

|}

Semi-finals

|}

Replay

|}

Final

References

2007–08
2007–08 domestic association football cups
Cup